Timothy Olle (30 September 1926 – 26 June 1999) was an Australian rules football player for  in the Victorian Football League (VFL).

Playing career
Olle made his league debut for the Saints in Round 17 of the 1949 VFL season and played the final three rounds of the season. He played two matches the following season before playing his final match in Round 8 of the 1951 season.

In 1952 he requested a transfer to Victorian Football Association (VFA) club Port Melbourne.

References

1926 births
1999 deaths
St Kilda Football Club players
Port Melbourne Football Club players
Australian rules footballers from Victoria (Australia)